Semantic discord is the situation where two parties disagree on the definition of a word(s) that is essential to communicating or formulating the concept(s) being discussed. That is to say, the two parties basically understand two different meanings for the word, or they associate the word with different concepts. Such discord can lead to a semantic dispute, a disagreement that arises if the parties involved disagree about the definition of a word or phrase. Consequently, their disagreeing on these definitions explains why there is a dispute at all.

It is sometimes held that semantic disputes are not genuine disputes at all, but very often they are regarded as perfectly genuine, e.g., in philosophy. It is also sometimes held that when a semantic dispute arises, the focus of the debate should switch from the original thesis to the meaning of the terms of which there are different definitions (understandings, concepts, etc.). Semantic disputes can result in the logical fallacy of equivocation. In politics, for example, semantic disputes can involve the meaning of words such as liberal, democrat, conservative, republican, progressive, free, welfare or socialist.

Semantic discord often arises due to differences in the cultural backgrounds or professional fields of the communicators.

Any word or instance of communication that has its effectiveness reduced due to semantic discord is said to be semantically loaded, i.e., the information has semantic content and is "propositionally structured," wherein implicit beliefs are tacit.

Example

An example of semantic discord can be found in N-rays under pathological science.

Avoiding semantic discord is a particular difficulty for language translators.

See also
Semantics
Loaded language
Connotation

References

Semantics
Discourse analysis